Jack Woodward  (born 3 October 1951) is a Canadian lawyer. He specializes in Canadian Aboriginal law and is the author of Aboriginal Law in Canada, which is considered the leading Canadian publication on Aboriginal Law.

Woodward was named to Maclean's Power List in February 2022 as one of the top 50 Canadians who are forging paths, leading the debate and shaping how we think and live.
Woodward has practiced law since 1979, primarily in the areas of Aboriginal law and environmental law. He has represented more than a hundred First Nations groups and organizations in a wide variety of legal actions including the landmark case, Tsilhqot'in Nation v British Columbia, the first successful Aboriginal title claim in Canada.

In 1980 he ran as a political candidate for the New Democratic Party in the Canadian federal election for the riding of North Vancouver—Burnaby.

Woodward wrote the first draft of section 35 of the Constitution Act, 1982, which provides constitutional protection to the indigenous and treaty rights of indigenous peoples in Canada. Ian Waddell, in his book Take the Torch: A Political Memoir, states that Woodward drafted the clause in January 1981, during negotiations in Ottawa with Minister of Justice Jean Chrétien. This is also referred to in the book Box of Treasures or Empty Box? Twenty Years of Section 35 on page 18.

In 1988 he established the legal firm, Woodward and Company. He was also an adjunct professor of law at the University of Victoria for sixteen years, where he was instrumental in creating the University's first course in Aboriginal law.

In December 2011 Woodward was instated as a Queen's Counsel for the Canadian province of British Columbia.

Family history 
Jack Woodward's great aunt, Elizabeth Woodward, was married to John Oliver, the 19th premier of British Columbia. His great uncle was Mark Sweeten Wade.

Publications

Aboriginal Law 
Aboriginal Law is a comprehensive collection of all the laws in Canada relating specifically to Aboriginal people. International law, constitutional law, statute, common law and custom are all covered, with updates six times per year and frequent revisions to whole chapters and sections in this rapidly-evolving field. Native Law was reviewed by the Alberta Law Review Society which described the text as, "a valuable aid for legal researchers who wish to establish a background in the subject area as well as for practitioners who need to know what law applies to specific issues before them."

Consolidated Aboriginal Law Statutes, Regulations and Treaties 
Under the editorial direction of Jack Woodward, this work continues to bring together a timely consolidation of the significant statutes, regulations, and treaties that have an impact on the area of native law. Additionally, this text contains helpful finding tools that simplify research, including a detailed master table of contents, a table of contents for each statute, and a comprehensive key word index.

Bullen & Leake & Jacob's Canadian Precedents of Pleadings 
Bullen & Leake & Jacob’s Precedents of Pleadings is widely regarded as the essential guide to drafting statements of case. It offers the advocate a stock of authoritative, structured precedents of statements of case complete with guiding commentary across both mainstream and specialist areas of practice. Woodward wrote part 1 which covers critical underlying principles through discussion and application within some of the more challenging areas of Aboriginal Law.

Notable legal cases

MacMillan Bloedel Ltd. v Mullin, 1985 
In 1984, members of the Nuu-chah-nulth First Nation and other protesters blocked MacMillan Bloedel’s access to its logging operations on Meares Island which is located in the Clayoquot Sound region of British Columbia. The dispute falls under the assertion by the Province of British Columbia who designates the targeted land as Crown Land, whereas protesters claimed that by allowing logging on Meares Island, there would be a direct interference with Aboriginal title. A court injunction was sought to halt MacMillan Bloedel's operations until the claim was resolved. The Martin (Meares Island) case was adjourned by agreement of the Nuu-chah-nulth First Nation, MacMillan Bloedel, and the governments of British Columbia and Canada. The injunction on logging is still in effect and none of the parties have requested resumption of the trial.

Tsilhqot’in Nation v. BC, 2014 
Tsilhqot’in Nation v. British Columbia is a landmark decision of the Supreme Court of Canada and the first case to successfully establish a declaration of Aboriginal title over land that a nation had historically occupied. The underlying circumstances that established the reasoning behind that case begin in 1983 when the province issued licence to Carrier Lumber to begin logging in the remote areas of central British Columbia which was claimed by the Xeni Gwet'in band of the Tsilhqot'in Nation. The Xeni Gwet'in filed suit seeking a court declaration that would prohibit Carrier Lumber's commercial logging operations in this area, and establish their claim for Aboriginal title to the land. After five years at trial, both the federal and provincial governments opposed the title claim which resulted to a final appeal to the Supreme Court of Canada. The Supreme Court, led by Chief Justice Beverly McLachlin, unanimously allowed the appeal. The Supreme Court of Canada ruled that the Tsilhqot'in people were entitled to a declaration of Aboriginal title to the 1,750 square kilometre region they had historically occupied.

Fort McKay First Nation v Prosper Petroleum Ltd, 2020 
On 24 April 2020, the Alberta Court of Appeal released a decision in Fort McKay First Nation v Prosper Petroleum Ltd, allowing Fort McKay First Nation's (FMFN) challenge to the Alberta Energy Regulator's (AER) decision to approve Prosper Petroleum's oil sands project. In granting its approval of the project, the AER did not consider the negotiations between the Alberta government and FMFN over land management and the impacts of future oil sands development on FMFN’s Treaty 9 rights. The Alberta Court of Appeal determined that the failure to consider these negotiations in the AER decision was not in keeping with the honour of the Crown. The court vacated the project approval and directed the Alberta Energy Regulator to reconsider whether the project is in the public’s best interest after considering FMFN's Treaty 8 rights.

References

External links 

 

Canadian legal scholars
20th-century Canadian lawyers
Canadian legal writers
1953 births
Living people
Canadian King's Counsel
21st-century Canadian lawyers
21st-century King's Counsel
New Democratic Party candidates for the Canadian House of Commons